Lekkum is a village in Leeuwarden municipality in the Friesland province of the Netherlands. It had a population of around 405 in January 2017.

De Bullemolen in Lekkum marks the finishing point of the ''Elfstedentocht.

History
The village was first mentioned in the 13th century as Lackum. The etymology is unclear. The Dutch Reformed church was built in 1778 as a replacement of a medieval church. The tower was rebuilt in 1896. The polder mill De Bullemolen was built in 1825. Since 2006, it serves as a backup from the pumping station. In 1840, Lekkum was home to 127 people. 

Before 1944, Lekkum was part of Leeuwarderadeel municipality.

Gallery

References

Leeuwarden
Populated places in Friesland